Nallur is a panchayat town in Tenkasi district in the Indian state of Tamil Nadu.
It is located in a municipality under Aalangulam Panchayat Union . Its parts are Kasiyapuram, Aladipatti, Vaithilingapuram,Sivakamiyapuram, Kamarajnagar, Aravankudieruppu, Periyarnagar,Rajivkantinagar.

Economy
The primary industry is agriculture, grocery, rice mills, oil production plant, garment manufacture, tirunir manufacture, coconut copra drying, July brick, woodwork, involved in the palattarapatta. Most of the women is involved in the  beedi roller work.

Government

Amenities
The central library is located near the Mutharamman kovil kasiyapuram used by the students and villagers. 
Nallur Post Office is  located inside St Paul's Church campus at west entrance of Nallur. Nallur postal index number is  PIN : 627 853.

Landmark
Sri Vaithiyalingaswamy Annai Yogambigai temple, Aladipatti is an old shiva temple which is located center of Nallur.

St Paul's Church Nallur it was built by British  pastor Renious it is 150 years old, which is also located west entrance of village.

Schools and colleges
West Tirunelveli Higher Secondary School
Swami Sri vaithiyalinga swamy Primary & High School
TDTA Elementary School
CMS Elementary School
CSI Jayaraj Annapackiam College

Bank and ATM 

Bank of Baroda, Linked Branch, Aladipatti
TMB ATM

Transportation 
Mini bus service is primary transport to connect nearest city Alangulam.

Notable people
 Aladi Aruna was an Indian politician and former Member of the Legislative Assembly. He is native to Nallur village.

 Aladi Sankaraiya is a Senior Congress Leader , Ex Secretary in Tamilnadu Congress Committee, and Star Orator. He is native to Nallur village.

References

Cities and towns in Tirunelveli district